Ranson's Folly may refer to:

 Ranson's Folly (1926 film), a 1926 silent film
 Ranson's Folly (1915 film), a lost 1915 silent film